Flávio Elias Cordeiro (born April 23, 1975), known as just Flávio, is a Brazilian football player.

Club statistics

References

External links

1975 births
Living people
Brazilian footballers
Brazilian expatriate footballers
J2 League players
Shonan Bellmare players
Paraná Clube players
Avaí FC players
Moreirense F.C. players
Expatriate footballers in Portugal
Expatriate footballers in Japan
Association football forwards